Sir Henry Bingham, 3rd Baronet (1654 – 5 July 1714) was an Irish politician and baronet.

He was the eldest son Sir George Bingham, 2nd Baronet and his first wife, Anne Partiger. In 1682, he succeeded his father as baronet. Bingham was educated at the Middle Temple. From 1682 he was Custos Rotulorum of Mayo. In 1692, Bingham entered the Irish House of Commons for Mayo, representing the constituency until his death in 1714. He was High Sheriff of Mayo in 1684 and again in 1694.

On 4 September 1677, he married firstly Jane Cuffe, daughter of Sir James Cuffe, he married secondly Lettice Hart née Vesey widow of Merrick Hart. He died childless and was succeeded in the baronetcy by his younger half-brother George.

References

1654 births
1714 deaths
Bingham Baronets, of Castlebar
Irish MPs 1692–1693
Irish MPs 1695–1699
Irish MPs 1703–1713
Irish MPs 1713–1714
Politicians from County Mayo
Members of the Middle Temple
Members of the Parliament of Ireland (pre-1801) for County Mayo constituencies
High Sheriffs of Mayo